The discography of American musician Kid Cudi consists of eight studio albums, one compilation album, one box set, three extended plays (EPs), one mixtape, 32 singles (including 15 as a featured artist), eight promotional singles and 32 music videos, the details of which are included in his videography.

Aside from his solo career, Cudi is a member of WZRD, a rock band and production team he formed with longtime friend and collaborator Dot da Genius. Additionally, Cudi is also one half of the hip hop duos Kids See Ghosts and The Scotts, alongside fellow American rappers Kanye West and Travis Scott, respectively. As of June 2020, Kid Cudi has sold a combined 22 million records in the US, according to the Recording Industry Association of America (RIAA).

Albums

Studio albums

Collaborative albums

Compilation albums

Box sets

EPs

Mixtapes

Singles

As lead artist

As featured artist

Promotional singles

Other charted and certified songs

Guest appearances

Production discography

See also
 List of songs recorded by Kid Cudi
 Kid Cudi videography
 Kids See Ghosts discography
 WZRD discography
 List of awards and nominations received by Kid Cudi

Notes

References

External links
 
 
 
 

Discographies of American artists
Hip hop discographies
Production discographies
Discography